Gothics is a mountain in the High Peaks Region of the Adirondack Mountains. The mountain gets its name due to its large rock slides' resemblance to Gothic architecture. The summit has near 360 degree views, which combined with its location in the High Peaks Region, gives splendid views of the Adirondacks.

Gallery

References

External links 
 
 

Mountains of Essex County, New York
Adirondack High Peaks
Mountains of New York (state)